Kay O'Brien is an American medical drama television series set at fictional Manhattan General Hospital, which aired for one season on CBS from September 25 to November 13, 1986, during the 1986-87 television season.

Overview
The series stars Patricia Kalember as Dr. Kay "Kayo" O'Brien.  CBS had high hopes for this multi-racial medical drama, but it received low ratings and was cancelled after airing just 8 episodes.

Lifetime bought the rights to the entire series, and has occasionally aired all 12 episodes.

Cast
Patricia Kalember as Dr. Kay "Kayo" O'Brien
Brian Benben as Dr. Mark Doyle
Jan Rubeš as Dr. Joseph Wallach
Lane Smith as Dr. Robert Moffit
Priscilla Lopez as Rosa Villanueva, RN
Keone Young as Dr. Michael Kwan
Tony Soper as Dr. Cliff Margolis

Episodes

External links

1980s American drama television series
1986 American television series debuts
1986 American television series endings
CBS original programming
1980s American medical television series
English-language television shows
Television shows set in New York City